Parma is an urban locality (an urban-type settlement) under the administrative jurisdiction of the town of republic significance of Usinsk in the Komi Republic, Russia. As of the 2010 Census, its population was 1,248.

Administrative and municipal status
Within the framework of administrative divisions, the urban-type settlement of Parma is incorporated as Parma Urban-Type Settlement Administrative Territory, which is subordinated to the town of republic significance of Usinsk. Within the framework of municipal divisions, Parma is a part of Usinsk Urban Okrug.

References

Notes

Sources

Urban-type settlements in the Komi Republic
